The sixth series of The Voice เสียงจริงตัวจริง ( also known as The Voice Thailand ) on 12 November 2017. The show was hosted by Songsit Rungnopphakhunsi and Rinrani Siphen on Channel 3.

Teams
Color key

	

	

 Pathitta & Saran originally were solo artist but Joey Boy chose both of them to advance as a duo in the Battles with approval from the producers.

Blind auditions
Color key

Episode 1 (November 12)

Episode 2 (November 19)

Episode 3 (November 26)

Episode 4 (December 3)

Episode 5 (December 10)

 Chirawan Sonsa-atdi was eliminated but Joey Boy gave her a second chance.

Episode 6 (December 17)

The Knockouts
Color key:

The Battles

  – Artist won the Battles and advanced to the Live Playoffs
  – Artist lost the Battles and was eliminated

Live shows

Episode 13 & 14 : Live Shows (February 11 & 18)
  Artist advanced to the Final by the Public's votes
  Artist advanced to the Final by his/her coach
  Artist was eliminated

Episode 15 : Final (February 25)

Elimination chart
Color key
Artist's info

Result details

The Voice Thailand
2017 Thai television seasons
2018 Thai television seasons